The following is a list of California Golden Bears men's basketball head coaches. There have been 18 head coaches of the Golden Bears in their 114-season history.

California's most recent head coach is Mark Fox. He was hired as the Golden Bears' head coach in March 2019, replacing Wyking Jones, who was fired after the 2018–19 season.

References

California

California Golden Bears men's basketball coaches